Between 1960 and 1969, there were 314 Thor missiles launched, of which 272 were successful, giving an 86.6% success rate.

Launch statistics

Rocket configurations

Launch sites

Launch outcomes

1960
There were 29 Thor missiles launched in 1960. 22 of the 29 launches were successful, giving a 75.8% success rate.

1961
There were 27 Thor missiles launched in 1961. 21 of the 27 launches were successful, giving a 77.7% success rate.

1962
There were 50 Thor missiles launched in 1962. 42 of the 50 launches were successful, giving an 84% success rate.

1963
There were 30 Thor missiles launched in 1963. 26 of the 30 launches were successful, giving an 86.6% success rate.

1964
There were 41 Thor missiles launched in 1964. 34 of the 41 launches were successful, giving an 82.9% success rate.

1965
There were 36 Thor missiles launched in 1965. 33 of the 36 launches were successful, giving a 91.6% success rate.

1966
There were 27 Thor missiles launched in 1966. 25 of the 27 launches were successful, giving a 92.6% success rate.

1967
There were 29 Thor missiles launched in 1967. 28 of the 29 launches were successful, giving a 96.6% success rate.

1968
There were 23 Thor missiles launched in 1968. 21 of the 23 launches were successful, giving a 91.3% success rate.

1969
There were 22 Thor missiles launched in 1969. 20 of the 22 launches were successful, giving a 90.9% success rate.

Images

See also

Lists of Thor and Delta launches
Lists of Thor launches
Lists of Delta launches